High voltage is electrical potential large enough to cause injury or damage.

High Voltage may also refer to:

Arts, entertainment and media

Film 
 High Voltage (1929 film), an American pre-Code film
 High Voltage (1981 film), a Croatian film 
 High Voltage (1997 film), a direct-to-video action film
 High Voltage (2018 film), an American scifi horror film

Music 
 High Voltage (1976 album), by AC/DC, released internationally
 "High Voltage" (song), by AC/DC, 1975
 High Voltage (1975 album), by AC/DC, released only in Australia
 High Voltage (Eddie Harris album), 1969
 High Voltage (Emerson, Lake & Palmer album), 2010
 High Voltage (Count Basie album), 1970
 "High Voltage", a song by Linkin Park from versions of the 1999 album Hybrid Theory
 High Voltage, a Bahamian band, later Baha Men 
 High Voltage Festival, a music festival in London, England

Other uses in arts, entertainment and media
 High Voltage Magazine, first published in 2003
 High Voltage, an Institution of Engineering and Technology academic journal
 High Voltage, a character in Disney's Big Hero 6
 High Voltage, later Faction Talk, a satellite radio channel 
 High Voltage Radio, AC/DC's pop-up digital radio station in Australia

Sport
 High Voltage (professional wrestling), a tag team of Robbie Rage and Kenny Kaos
 Matt Hardy (born 1974), professional wrestler, ring name High Voltage

Other uses
 High Voltage (horse) (foaled 1952), a Thoroughbred racehorse 
 High voltage in a digital signal, also known as "logical 1"
 High Voltage Software, an American game development company

See also 

 High Tension (disambiguation)
 Electric power transmission
 Overhead power line